RANCID (Really Awesome New Cisco confIg Differ) is a network management application released under a BSD-style license.
RANCID uses Expect to connect to the routers, send some commands and put the results in files.

Software which utilises RANCID-collected configs 

LibreNMS
Observium
OpenNMS

See also

Network management system (NMS)
Console Server
Router
Switch

References

 Shrubbery Networks, Inc. RANCID

External links
 Website of RANCID: RANCID - Really Awesome New Cisco confIg Differ
 Joe Abley and Stephen Stuart: Internet Software Consortium 
 Peter Harrison: Network Device Backups with Rancid at linuxhomenetworking.com

Free network management software
Configuration management
Software using the BSD license